Stavros Mendros is an American politician and consultant from Maine. He represented Lewiston in the Maine House of Representatives from 1998 to 2002.

References

Republican Party members of the Maine House of Representatives
Living people
Politicians from Lewiston, Maine
Year of birth missing (living people)